Ceratina cyanea, common name blue carpenter bee, is a species of bee belonging to the family Apidae, subfamily Xylocopinae.

Distribution
This species is present in most of Western Europe, in North West Africa and in the eastern Palearctic realm (excluding China).

Habitat
This undemanding species colonize both dry habitats and wetlands. It inhabits forest edges, thickets and gardens.

Description

Head, chest and abdomen show a metallic blue colour. These bees have three submarginal cells in forewings, club-shaped antennae and a long thin tongue. The scutellum is densely punctured. The seventh tergite has a deep saddle and ends in two points.

Biology
The blue carpenter bees fly from mid-March to mid-October, collecting pollen at various families of plants, especially knapweed (Centaurea), yellow composites (Asteraceae) and Lotus (Fabaceae).

Females dig the nest extracting the soft tissue that fills the cavities of the vertical or slanted dry plant stems and small branches, such as thistles, blackberries (Rubus species), elderberries (Sambucus species) and roses. Then they provide the cells with a mixture of regurgitated nectar and pollen to feed the larvae. Adult males and females overwinter inside their cells into the stems. Often several insects spend the winter together.

References

cyanea
Hymenoptera of Europe
Insects described in 1802